Guillermo Graaven (born 17 January 1982) is a Dutch former professional footballer who played as a forward.

Club career
After progressing through the Ajax youth academy, he joined Ipswich Town with fellow Dutchman Nabil Abidallah. He left the English club without playing for the senior team.. 

He made his debut in professional football in his native country at TOP Oss after unsuccessful trials with Motherwell, Standard Liège and Anderlecht. Later, he played for other Dutch clubs at the Eerste Divisie and amateur leagues before retiring in 2010.

International career
Graaven played six times for the Netherlands U-17. He played in all the three matches at the 1999 UEFA European Under-16 Championship qualifying where his team failed to qualify to the finals.

References

External links
Voetbal International profile

Dutch footballers
Footballers from Amsterdam
TOP Oss players
SC Telstar players
Eerste Divisie players
1982 births
Living people
FC Lienden players
AFC Ajax players
Ipswich Town F.C. players
SV Huizen players
Association football forwards
Dutch expatriate footballers
Dutch expatriate sportspeople in England
Expatriate footballers in England
Netherlands youth international footballers